Greece competes at the 2018 Mediterranean Games in Taragona, Spain from 22 June to  1 July 2018.

Medal summary

Medal table

|  style="text-align:left; width:78%; vertical-align:top;"|

|  style="text-align:left; width:22%; vertical-align:top;"|

Archery

Men

Women

Athletics 

Key
Note–Ranks given for track events are within the athlete's heat only
Q = Qualified for the next round
q = Qualified for the next round as a fastest loser or, in field events, by position without achieving the qualifying target
NR = National record
N/A = Round not applicable for the event
Bye = Athlete not required to compete in round

Men
Track & road events

Field events

Women
Track & road events

Field events

Badminton

Men

Women

Basketball 3X3

Men's tournament

Team

Sarantis Mastrogiannopoulos
Konstantinos Oikonomopoulos
Nikolaos Persidis
Andreas Rekouniotis

Group D

Quarterfinal

Semifinal

Bronze-medal match

Women's tournament

Team

Vasiliki Souzana Karampatsa
Anastasia Ntaolengk Nixina
Garyfallia Paraskevi Ntanou
Georgia Stamati

Group A

Boxing

Men

Canoeing

Men

Women

Legend: FA = Qualify to final (medal); FB = Qualify to final B (non-medal)

Cycling

Men

Women

Equestrian

Jumping

Fencing

Men

Women

Football

Men's tournament

Group C

Semifinal

Bronze-medal match

Golf

Men

Women

Gymnastics

Artistic

Men

Apparatus

Women

Apparatus

Rhythmic

Handball

Men's tournament

Group C

Women's tournament

Group A

Judo

Men

Women

Karate

Men

Women

Rowing

Men

Women

Sailing

Men

Women

Shooting

Men

Women

Swimming

Swimming

Men

Women

Paralympic Swimming

Men

Table tennis

Men

Women

Taekwondo

Men

Women

Tennis

Men

Women

Volleyball

Men's tournament

Group A

Quarterfinal

Semifinal

Bronze-medal match

Women's tournament

Group A

Quarterfinal

Semifinal

Gold-medal match

Water polo

Men's tournament

Preliminary round

Gold-medal match

Women's tournament

Preliminary round

Bronze-medal match

Water skiing

Men

Women

Weightlifting

Men

Women

Wrestling

Men's Freestyle

Men's Greco-Roman

Women's Freestyle

References

Nations at the 2018 Mediterranean Games
2018
Mediterranean Games